La Madeleine-Villefrouin is a village and commune in the Loir-et-Cher department of central France.

Population

See also
 Communes of the Loir-et-Cher department

References

Communes of Loir-et-Cher